The Syracuse Orange men's basketball program is an intercollegiate men's basketball team representing Syracuse University in Syracuse, New York. The program is classified in the NCAA Division I of the National Collegiate Athletic Association (NCAA), and the team competes in the Atlantic Coast Conference (ACC).

Syracuse is considered one of the most prestigious college basketball programs in the country with 3 overall claimed National Championships and 1 NCAA Tournament championship, as well being a National Runner-up 2 times. Syracuse is ranked sixth in total victories among all NCAA Division I programs and seventh in all-time win percentage among programs with at least 50 years in Division I, with an all-time win–loss record of 2042–931† as of March 29, 2021. The Orange are also sixth in NCAA Tournament appearances (41), seventh in NCAA Tournament victories (70†), and seventh in Final Four appearances (6).

The Orange play their home games at the JMA Wireless Dome, referred to as the JMA Dome. The JMA Wireless Dome is the largest arena in NCAA DI basketball with a maximum capacity of 35,642. Syracuse's home court total attendance has led the nation 25 times, and its per-game season average attendance has been ranked first 14 times since the opening of the Carrier Dome in 1980. The most recent record-breaking game was against Duke in 2019 with the crowd of 35,642 people. The JMA Dome is often considered one of the best home court advantages in college basketball.

Under former head coach Jim Boeheim, 10 Big East regular season championships, 5 Big East tournament championships, 35 NCAA tournament appearances (and 41 all-time), and 3 appearances in the national title game. 

In 2015, after a lengthy investigation, the NCAA's Committee on Infractions ordered Syracuse to vacate 101 wins from five different seasons; however, the NCAA confirmed that sanctions did not include the removal of any trophies or banners, and Syracuse claims all of its NCAA Tournaments appearances and conference titles from those years. The investigation required Syracuse to vacate 79 wins from the 2006, 2007, and 2012 seasons, ending their former record of 46 current consecutive winning seasons.

History

Early history 

Basketball started at Syracuse in February 1898 and Athletic Director John A. R. Scott served as the first coach. Syracuse fielded its first varsity basketball team in 1916–17.  The program rose to national prominence early in its history, being recognized by the Helms Athletic Foundation as national champions for 1918 (under Coach Edmund Dollard) and 1926.  The program made National Invitation Tournament appearances in 1946 and 1950, won the 1951 National Campus Tournament, and made its first NCAA men's basketball tournament appearance in 1957.  Notable early era players included Hall of Famer Vic Hanson and racial pioneer Wilmeth Sidat-Singh.

National emergence 

The modern era of Syracuse basketball began with the arrival of future Hall of Famer Dave Bing. As a sophomore in 1964, Bing led the team to an NIT appearance and as a senior in 1966, he led the team to its second NCAA tournament appearance, where it reached the regional final.  Bing's backcourt partner on these teams was future Syracuse coach Jim Boeheim.

Syracuse remained competitive after Bing's departure, with NIT appearances in 1967, 1971, and 1972.  Under coach Roy Danforth, in 1973, the team began a string of consecutive NCAA appearances highlighted by a Final Four appearance in 1975. The 1975 squad featured guard Jim Lee and forward Rudy Hackett and was affectionately known as "Roy's Runts."

Big East era (1979–2013)

Jim Boeheim Takeover 
Following the 1976 season, Danforth was hired away by Tulane University and the university turned to young assistant Jim Boeheim (a native of Lyons, New York) to assume the helm. Boeheim extended the string of NCAA appearances to nine, with bids in each of his first four seasons, a period in which his teams won 100 games. These teams featured star forward Louis Orr and center Roosevelt Bouie, and were sometimes referred to as the "Louie and Bouie Show."

A new conference 
Syracuse was a founding member of the Big East Conference in 1979, along with Georgetown University, St. John's University and Providence College.  Syracuse and Georgetown were each ranked in the top ten in 1980, and a new and major rivalry blossomed when Georgetown snapped Syracuse's 57-game home winning streak in the final men's basketball game played at Manley Field House.  Over the next ten seasons, these two schools met eight times in the Big East tournament, four times in the finals, and met numerous times on national television during the regular season.

Syracuse won the Big East tournament in 1981, but was passed over by the NCAA Tournament.  The team, featuring Danny Schayes and Leo Rautins, finished runner-up in the NIT. The team returned to the NIT in 1982, before beginning another extended streak of NCAA appearances in 1983.

The Pearl 

In 1983, heralded high school phenomenon Dwayne "Pearl" Washington joined the team, and led the school to NCAA appearances in 1984, 1985, and 1986, before leaving school early for the NBA draft.

Washington grew up in the Brownsville section of Brooklyn, New York, where he acquired his nickname as an eight-year-old in a taunting comparison to Earl "the Pearl" Monroe. He was a playground phenomenon from Boys and Girls High School in Brooklyn, and was rated as the number one overall high school player in the United States 1983. He brought his flashy play to Syracuse University and the Carrier Dome. "The Pearl" was the master of the "shake and bake" and the "cross-over" moves.

It is believed that Pearl Washington brought Syracuse basketball to national prominence and helped usher the Big East into the national spotlight in the mid-1980s. In the Carrier Dome's first three years, Syracuse's highest attendance mark was a mere 20,401 in the 1982–83. In 1983, Pearl's freshman year, Syracuse's attendance increased to 22,380 per game. As a sophomore, Syracuse led the nation in attendance for the first time in school history. Syracuse would be the NCAA's attendance leader for the next ten years. By the time Washington was a junior, Syracuse's average attendance had jumped to 26,225. Syracuse Coach Jim Boeheim, who has long said that there would be no Syracuse basketball program as we know it without Pearl, he once said:He's the only guy who could just overnight fill the place like that. He had an unbelievable effect on our program. Everybody says that Patrick Ewing and Chris Mullin made the Big East, but I think Pearl made the league. They were the best players, but Pearl was the player that people turned out to see and turned on their TVs to watch. We had the highest-rated games every year that Pearl was here. He was a guy who everybody wanted to see play. He not only helped make our program, he helped make the Big East and he helped college basketball.
In 2016, at the December 17 Georgetown game, joined alongside Washington's family, friends and former teammates, SU Director of Athletics John Wildhack helped unveil the No. 31 logo at center court to honor Washington. Washington died from brain cancer earlier that year eight months after being diagnosed. Washington has a street named after him in the Brownsville section of his native Brooklyn, New York.

Falling just short 
Despite the early loss of Washington, Syracuse returned to the NCAAs in 1987, with a team featuring Rony Seikaly, Sherman Douglas and freshman Derrick Coleman, reaching the National Championship game before losing, 74–73, in the final to Indiana on a last-second jump shot by Keith Smart.  Led by Coleman, Douglas, Seikaly, Stephen Thompson and Billy Owens, the school extended its string of NCAA appearances to 10 seasons before that string was broken in 1993, due to NCAA sanctions resulting from an incident involving a booster.

Led by guard Lawrence Moten and forward John Wallace, the school returned to the NCAAs in 1994 and 1995. In 1996, Wallace led the team to its third Final Four appearance and second National Championship game, where it played impressively before losing, 76–67, to a heavily favored Kentucky team that included nine future NBA players (Kentucky head coach Rick Pitino had been an assistant coach to Boeheim in 1976, 1977).

A new millennium dawns 

The 1997 squad won 19 games but was bypassed by the NCAA tournament and appeared in the NIT.  The 1998, 1999, and 2000 squads featuring guard Jason Hart and center Etan Thomas all earned NCAA bids. In 2000, the university also named its All-Century Team, recognizing its greatest players of the 20th century and the school's first 100 years of basketball.  The team made a fourth consecutive NCAA appearance in 2001, but returned to the NIT in 2002, despite having a 20-win season. This marked the first time a school with 20 wins from the Big East Conference was denied a bid to the NCAA Tournament.

Champions at last 

Although unranked in the preseason polls for the 2002–03 season, led by freshmen Carmelo Anthony, Gerry McNamara and sophomore Hakim Warrick, the Orangemen won their first NCAA tournament championship with an 81–78 defeat of the University of Kansas in the final. Anthony was named NCAA basketball tournament Most Outstanding Player.

After the crown
Anthony left for the NBA draft after the school year, but McNamara and Warrick stayed on, leading the team to NCAA bids in 2004 and 2005. The latter season saw Syracuse introduce a new nickname, dropping "Orangemen" and "Orangewomen" in favor of "Orange".In 2006, McNamara would lead the Orange to an extremely unexpected Big East Championship victory, making the ninth-seeded Orange the lowest seed to ever win the championship and only the third school to repeat as Big East tournament champions, but was immediately defeated in the opening round of the 2006 NCAA tournament by Texas A&M, 66–58.

The 2007–08 season for the Orange was up and down. The Orange had a 50-point win over East Tennessee State on December 15, the largest margin of victory in 20 seasons.  They recorded top-25 wins over Georgetown and Marquette.  But the team lost to Villanova in the Big East tournament opening round, and to UMass in the NIT. UMass became the first team ever to beat the Orange twice in the same season at the Carrier Dome.

In the 2008–09 season Syracuse was led by sophomore guard Jonny Flynn. The team returned key players like Eric Devendorf, Andy Rautins, Rick Jackson, Arinze Onuaku and Paul Harris. Syracuse gained a tremendous amount of media attention following a 127–117 upset of UConn in six overtimes during the early morning hours of March 13, 2009 "the Game that wouldn't end" to advance to the semifinals of the Big East Conference tournament. This game solidified their seeding in the 2009 NCAA tournament. This game was the second longest of any game in NCAA History and only the fourth to make it into six overtimes.  However, they lost in the Big East Final. Syracuse received a 3 seed and beat Stephen F. Austin 59–44 in the first round. Syracuse stamped its ticket to the Sweet 16 for the first time since 2004, defeating sixth seed Arizona State 78–67. However, the season ended with a loss to No. 2 seed Oklahoma, as the Sooners ended the Orange's season with an 84–71 loss.

At the start of the 2009–10 season, having lost three key players (Devendorf, Flynn, Harris) from the previous season, the Orange was not considered a top contender, unranked in the preseason AP Poll. An early exhibition game loss to local LeMoyne College, a Division II school, did little to improve the outlook. However, led by its starters, returning seniors Andy Rautins and Arinze Onuaku, junior Rick Jackson, a relatively unknown transfer from Iowa State University, forward Wes Johnson, freshman point guard Brandon Triche, plus standout reserve players, sophomores Kris Joseph and Scoop Jardine, the team began to deliver, winning its first 13 regular season games. By the second week of rankings, the Orange had climbed into the top ten, staying in the top five continuously from week 9. Syracuse reached a number one ranking two weeks before the season ended, finishing the season in fourth place with its best-ever regular season win–loss performance, at 28–3.  It finished on top of the Big East for the regular season, losing in the Big East tournament's quarter finals. A 1-seed in the West Region of the 2010 NCAA tournament, the Orange fell in the Sweet Sixteen to 5-seed and AP #11 Butler to end the season 30–5.

Senior Big East Defensive player of the Year Rick Jackson and Juniors Kris Joseph and Scoop Jardine led the 2010–2011 Orange. Syracuse started strong by winning their first 18 contests before losing in Pittsburgh. That loss started a slide for the Orange, who lost six of their next eight games. The Orange regained their momentum by beating the West Virginia Mountaineers to start a six-game winning streak before losing in overtime to the Connecticut Huskies in the semi-finals of the Big East tournament. With a record of 28–7, the Orange garnered a #3 seed in the East Region of the NCAA tournament. The Orange easily handled Indiana State 77–60 in their first game. The Orange faced Marquette in the second round when one of the tournament's more controversial moments occurred. With the game tied at 59 with 51 seconds left, a backcourt violation was called on the Orange when Scoop Jardine retrieved Dion Waiters' inbound pass with one foot landing in the front court before his second settled in the backcourt. NCAA officiating coordinator John Adams admitted the call was made in error however; the officials were unaware of the full rule. According to the 2010 and 2011 NCAA Men's and Women's Basketball Rulebook, Rule 4, Section 3, Article 8 states: "After a jump ball or during a throw-in, the player in his/her front court, who makes the initial touch on the ball while both feet are off the playing court, may be the first to secure control of the ball and land with one or both feet in the back court. It makes no difference if the first foot down was in the front court or back court."  Marquette guard Darius Johnson-Odom hit a three-pointer on the ensuing possession with 27 second left to give the Golden Eagles the lead for good and a spot to the Sweet Sixteen. The loss culminated a season in which SU remained undefeated outside of their conference for the first time in the program's history.

2012–13 was the school's last season in the Big East Conference.  Led by sophomore point guard Michael Carter-Williams and Junior forward C.J. Fair, the team made its fifth trip to the Final Four.

Atlantic Coast Conference era (2013 – present) 
On July 1, 2013, Syracuse, Notre Dame and Pittsburgh joined the Atlantic Coast Conference (ACC). In its first season in the conference, Syracuse started 25–0 before losing six of its last nine games.  The team featured two Second Team All Americans, point guard Tyler Ennis and forward C.J. Fair, and finished second in the ACC regular season standings.

The Orange underperformed 2014–15 expectations with an 18–13 record behind First Team All-ACC center Rakeem Christmas. Though the team was not eligible for the NCAA tournament due to the self-imposed post-season ban by the university, this would change in the following 2015–16 season as the Orange made the Final Four as a 10-seed by defeating Dayton, Middle Tennessee, Gonzaga, and Virginia.

The following season Syracuse started ranked 19th in the AP Poll, but failed to make the NCAA tournament. In the 2017–18 season Syracuse would return to the NCAA tournament despite going 8–10 in conference play. In the tournament Syracuse upset 3-seeded Michigan State before losing to Duke in the Sweet 16. The next year saw the Orange make back-to-back NCAA tournament appearances for the first time since the 2013–14 season. They lost to Baylor in the opening round. On January 14, 2019, Syracuse upset Duke in Cameron Indoor Stadium, marking the first time that the Blue Devils had lost to an unranked team at home as the AP ranked number one team. They would lose to Baylor in the opening round of the NCAA tournament. Syracuse started the 2019–20 season slow, losing 48–34 to Virginia, the lowest amount ever scored by a team in Boeheim's career. SU would win its final game of the season in the ACC tournament beating North Carolina 81–53 and defeating the Tar Heels for the first time since 2014. This would be the last game played due to the COVID-19 pandemic. In the 2020–21 season SU would once again upset its way to the Sweet 16 beating 3-seeded West Virginia before losing to eventual Final Four participant Houston.

Syracuse University Athletics scandal 

The NCAA's investigation into violations by Syracuse athletics date back to May 2007, following an initial report by the university to the NCAA, after the university learned that local YMCA employees paid some football and men's basketball student-athletes; Syracuse claims "the NCAA’s investigation of Syracuse has taken longer than any other investigation in NCAA history."

In March 2015, the NCAA released its infractions report which found that Syracuse had possibly violated rules. As a result, 101 wins were vacated by the NCAA in the 2004–2005, 2006–2007,  2010–2011, and 2011–2012 seasons.

The NCAA's ruling was confirmed by David Worlock, the NCAA's director of media coordination and statistics. Worlock is not part of the NCAA's Infractions or Enforcement offices. As the director of media coordination and statistics, he is working to update records based on the Committee on Infractions' sanctions. He said the COI's report on Syracuse differed from other investigations into violations at other schools in that it did not require the removal of championship trophies or banners signifying NCAA tournament appearances.

As a result, Syracuse retained the banner for its 2012 team's run to the NCAA Elite 8 and 2011 advancement to the third round of the NCAA tournament. Also, a Big East Conference official confirmed that the conference's updated media guide continues to list Syracuse as its 2005 and 2006 tournament champion.

Coaches 

† including 101 victories vacated by NCAA

Facilities

Archbold Gymnasium 

Syracuse home games in the early years were played at Archbold Gymnasium, an on-campus gym that is still used for various university activities. It was built in 1908 with money donated by John Dustin Archbold, a major benefactor of the university, who also funded the building of Archbold Stadium, just to the west of the gymnasium (now the site of the Carrier Dome). After a 1947 fire, most home games were played at Syracuse's state fairgrounds' Coliseum and other local venues from 1947 to 1949.

Manley Field House 

In 1962, home games moved to the newly constructed Manley Field House which finally gave the team a powerful home court advantage. At one time, the arena held 9,500 people for home games. The team became so fond of the space that its coaches objected to moving to the Carrier Dome when it was opened in 1980.

On February 13, 1980, the Georgetown Hoyas men's basketball team upset #2 ranked Syracuse 52–50 in the final planned, regular season game at Manley Field House, where the Orange boasted a 57-game home winning streak. Georgetown head coach John Thompson Jr. would declare after the victory during the news conference that "Manley Field House is officially closed". The game gave birth to a rivalry, not just between schools but between two contrasting future Hall of Fame coaches.

Manley Field House hosted the ECAC Upstate Region tournament organized by the Eastern College Athletic Conference (ECAC) in 1976 as well as a semifinal game of the 1977 ECAC South Region tournament.

Melo Center 

The Carmelo K. Anthony Basketball Center is the home of Syracuse basketball. The $19 million facility officially opened in September 2009. The facility includes two NCAA regulation-size practice courts, a weight room, training room, equipment room, locker rooms and coaches offices for both men's and women's basketball programs. In addition, fans can relive some of the greatest moments in Syracuse basketball history in the building's Hall of Fame Wing. The name comes from NBA star forward Carmelo Anthony, who was the major benefactor to the project.

Home court

The JMA Wireless Dome 

Because the Carrier Dome could not survive on a schedule of just 6 home football games a year, Syracuse Orange basketball team moved to their new home arena. In its setup for basketball, the Carrier Dome can hold crowds of more than 30,000 for its biggest games.

The Carrier Dome is the largest arena in NCAA DI basketball with a maximum capacity of 35,642. Syracuse's home court total attendance has led the nation 28 times, and its per-game average attendance has been ranked first 17 times since the opening of the Carrier Dome in 1980. Also, Syracuse has set and broken the NCAA on campus single game attendance record at the Carrier Dome 16 times. The most recent record-breaking game was against Duke in 2019 with a sellout crowd of 35,642 people.

In May 2018, the university announced a major renovation to the Carrier Dome as the central portion of a larger campus update. The renovation, estimated to cost $120 million, is expected to be completed in 2022. The most significant changes will be the replacement of the current air-supported roof with a fixed roof, two-thirds of which will be translucent, the installation of air conditioning and the largest centerhung videoboard in college sports. The upgrade will also include a new lighting and sound systems, Wi-Fi improvements, accessibility upgrades, improved restrooms, and new concession spaces.

Record breaking attendance

Madison Square Garden 

The Orange have been playing at Madison Square Garden, since an encounter with Manhattan on February 1, 1939. The 2018–19 season marked the 37th consecutive campaign that Syracuse played at least once in the facility. The latest streak began in 1983–84. 

* record stands as of December 18, 2018, and does not reflect wins vacated by the NCAA from 2004 to 2007 and 2010 to 2012.

Rivalries 
The original Big East was founded by seven charter schools in 1979 (Providence, St. John's, Georgetown, Syracuse, Seton Hall, Connecticut, and Boston College). Villanova joined the following year, followed by Pittsburgh in 1982. Throughout the 1980s and early 1990s, Georgetown, Villanova, St. John's, and Syracuse were the primary powers in the conference with UConn joining them in the 1990s. In less than a decade since its inception, the Big East became the most successful college basketball league in America. The documentary 30 for 30: Requiem For The Big East by ESPN Films chronicles well the meteoric ascension of the Big East conference.

Syracuse and Georgetown rivalry 
Syracuse and Georgetown rivalry — Syracuse's biggest rival is Georgetown. The two schools have been playing each other since 1930, but their rivalry was solidified in the 1980s as the respective programs were the leading powers during the infancy of the newly formed Big East conference. On February 13, 1980, the Georgetown Hoyas men's basketball team upset #2 ranked Syracuse 52–50 in the final planned, regular season game at Manley Field House, where the Orange boasted a 57-game home winning streak. Georgetown head coach John Thompson Jr. would declare after the victory during the news conference that "Manley Field House is officially closed". The game gave birth to a rivalry, not just between schools but between two contrasting future Hall of Fame coaches.

Georgetown–Syracuse rivalry has given the fans numerous memorable moments such as Michael Graham's punch during the Big East tournament at Madison Square Garden in New York City; Pearl Washington's buzzer beater clutch shot to beat defending national champion and #1 team in the country at the Carrier Dome; and coach Thompson's three technical fouls and ejection in the controversial Orange victory.

The animosity between the programs was further extended when Syracuse announced their decision to leave the Big East effective in 2013 to join the ACC. Georgetown and Syracuse have continued to play each other in the next years following their exit from the conference.

The Georgetown–Syracuse rivalry is regarded as one of college basketball's greatest rivalries between two storied programs.

Syracuse and Connecticut rivalry 

The first game played between the two schools took place on January 27, 1956. But the rivalry peaked while both teams were members of the Big East Conference from 1979 to 2013. The rivalry featured two Hall of Fame coaches, Jim Boeheim and Jim Calhoun. One of the highlights was the historic Big East tournament quarterfinal game in 2009. The game took place at Madison Square Garden in New York City where Syracuse won 127–117 in a game that went to six overtimes, ending at 1:22 AM.

Syracuse and Villanova rivalry 
Syracuse and Villanova rivalry — Both schools have strong basketball traditions and are former Big East rivals. The strength of the basketball rivalry is evidenced by the fact that Syracuse v. Villanova games have attracted some of the biggest college basketball crowds ever, breaking the NCAA on campus basketball attendance record twice, including one game with a crowd of 34,616 people in 2010. However, this rivalry has an uncertain future because of the schools' recent separation (Syracuse in the ACC, and Villanova in the new Big East).

Syracuse and Duke rivalry 
Syracuse entered the Atlantic Coast Conference (ACC) in 2013–2014 with the series that year tied 1–1 in two heated and controversial games. In the first, #2 Syracuse (21–0) met expectations by beating Duke in overtime at the Carrier Dome 91–89. The following game at Cameron Indoor Stadium was a 66–60h loss by then #1 Syracuse to Duke in which another questionable set of calls throughout the game culminated in Syracuse player CJ Fair being called for a charge on a possible game-winning play. Jim Boeheim stormed the court, threw his blazer to the ground, was given a technical and ejected. This led to many internet memes, jacket-tossing  two foul shots for Duke and an extra possession that sealed the game. This series led to discussions about a possible rivalry shaping up. The teams have swapped wins since then. Some additional notables in the rivalry include a current NCAA basketball attendance record set three times in 2014, 2015 and 2019 seasons at the Carrier Dome and a 2019 upset of #1 Duke by unranked Syracuse at Cameron Indoor Stadium. Interestingly, both coaches are friends. Boeheim and Duke hall-of-fame coach Mike Krzyzewski both coach the USA Olympic Basketball Team, with Boeheim the assistant to Krzyzewski. With Syracuse now in the ACC, the old Big East rivalries are losing steam (occasionally re-kindled by home-and-away series) so time will tell if this replaces them as the predominant rivalry for Syracuse.

The Orange lead all-time series with each of their rivals except Duke.

Updated December 18, 2022

Championships

Post-season success

NCAA tournament seeding
The NCAA began seeding the tournament with the 1979 edition.

* played in the "First Four" round

Complete NCAA tournament results
The Orange have appeared in the NCAA tournament 39 times. Their combined record is 69–40.

As a result of the COVID-19 pandemic, the 2020 NCAA tournament was cancelled.

NIT results

The Orange have appeared in the National Invitation Tournament (NIT) 13 times.

* – all wins in 2007 NIT were vacated as a result of the 2015 investigation of its athletics department.

National Campus Basketball Tournament results
The Orange appeared in the only National Campus Basketball Tournament where they were champions with a record of 3–0.

Conference tournament titles 
Since its beginnings in 1898, Syracuse had been independent program until it joined the Big East Conference in 1979. From 1975 to 1982, the Eastern College Athletic Conference (ECAC) organized annual regional end-of-season men's basketball tournaments for independent Division I ECAC member colleges and universities in the Northeastern United States. The winner of each regional tournament was declared the ECAC regional champion for the season and received an automatic bid in the NCAA Division I men's basketball tournament. In 2013, Syracuse joined the Atlantic Coast Conference.

† – Indicates season for which the school's overall and/or conference record has been later adjusted by penalty, however the titles are claimed by the university

Conference regular-season champions 
Syracuse had been independent program until it joined the Big East Conference in 1979. In 2013, Syracuse joined the Atlantic Coast Conference.

† – Indicates season for which the school's overall and/or conference record has been later adjusted by penalty, but the titles are claimed by the university

National polls 
Syracuse has finished in the Final Top 25 rankings 30 times in the AP Poll. Syracuse teams have spent a total of 17 weeks ranked number 1, most recently in 2014.

†  The Associated Press began compiling a ranking of the top 20 college men's basketball teams during the 1948–1949 season. It has issued the poll continuously since the 1950–1951 season. Beginning with the 1989–1990 season, the poll expanded to 25 teams. 
^  Final ballot of The Coaches Poll. (The second oldest poll still in use after the AP Poll).

Notable players and coaches

Retired jerseys 

Syracuse University honors jersey/uniform numbers of its athletes, but the numbers are not officially "retired" and remain active. Historically, Syracuse University has restricted the men's basketball team from wearing such numbers, but there have also been exceptions to this custom. An example of the former is Carmelo Anthony, who wore #22 in high school, but since the number was already "retired" at Syracuse, Anthony chose #15 as an alternate upon his arrival. Similarly, Gerry McNamara wore #31 in high school, also "retired" by Syracuse University (McNamara chose #3 instead).

The Naismith Memorial Basketball Hall of Fame

The Mannie Jackson - Basketball's Human Spirit Award
The award is given annually to an individual who has found the game of basketball to be a contributing aspect to their personal growth and accomplishment, a place to develop an understanding of others, and an avenue that helped shape that individual's growth into a recognized visionary and leader.

The Curt Gowdy Media Award
The Basketball Hall of Fame's media award was established by the board of trustees to single out members of the electronic and print media for outstanding contributions to basketball.

The NBA 75th Anniversary Team

The NBA 75th Anniversary Team, also referred to as the NBA 75, was chosen in 2021 to honor the 75th anniversary of the founding of the National Basketball Association (NBA). It was the fourth and most recent anniversary team in the league. Similar to the 50 Greatest Players in NBA History in 1996, a panel of media members, current and former players, coaches, general managers, and team executives selected the greatest players in league history.

Orange in the Olympics

National coaching awards

National award winners

College Basketball All-America selections

Syracuse basketball players have earned All-America honors over 70 times. Below are the consensus All-American recognitions, 12 of which are Consensus First-Team All-Americans.

NCAA Tournament awards

Big East Conference awards

Atlantic Coast Conference awards 

† co-winner

ACC All-Conference selections 
Syracuse basketball players in All-ACC teams since 2013–14 season.

ACC All-Defensive Team selections
Syracuse basketball players in ACC All-Defensive teams since 2013–14 season.

ACC All-Tournament Team selections 
Syracuse basketball players in ACC All-Tournament teams since 2013–14 season.

Year-by-year results
Since playing its first official season in 1898–99, Syracuse ranks fifth in total victories among all NCAA Division I programs and seventh in all-time win percentage among programs with at least 50 years in Division I, with an all-time win–loss record of 2042–931() as of March 30, 2021(vacated wins included). The Orange currently hold an active NCAA-record 51 consecutive winning seasons.

* - Indicates season for which the school's overall and/or conference record has been later adjusted by penalty

† - From 1975 to 1982, the Eastern College Athletic Conference (ECAC) organized annual regional end-of-season men's basketball tournaments for independent Division I ECAC member colleges and universities in the Northeastern United States. The winner of each regional tournament was declared the ECAC regional champion for the season and received an automatic bid in the NCAA Division I men's basketball tournament.

Players currently in the NBA 
 Carmelo Anthony, Small Forward for the Los Angeles Lakers
 Michael Carter-Williams, Point Guard who is a Free Agent
 Jerami Grant, Forward for the Portland Trail Blazers
 Oshae Brissett, Shooting guard for the Indiana Pacers
 Elijah Hughes, Small Forward for the Portland Trail Blazers

Players currently playing professionally around the world 
 C. J. Fair, Forward for the Windy City Bulls
 Rakeem Christmas, Forward for New Zealand Breakers
 Donté Greene, Forward for Sporting Al Riyadi Beirut
 Paul Harris, Forward for Trabzonspor B.K.
 Rick Jackson, Forward for Provence
 Scoop Jardine, Guard for the Niagara River Lions
 Kris Joseph, Forward for Élan Chalon
 Demetris Nichols, Forward for KK Cedevita
 Andy Rautins, Guard for Banvit B.K.
 James Southerland, Forward for the Santa Cruz Warriors
 Brandon Triche, Guard for P.A.O.K. BC
 Hakim Warrick, Forward for Leones de Ponce
 Darryl Watkins, Center for CLS Knights Indonesia
 Trevor Cooney, Guard for Básquet Coruña
 Michael Gbinije, Guard for the Santa Cruz Warriors
 Tyler Ennis, Point guard for the Fenerbahçe
 Andrew White III, Forward for the Afyon Belediye
 Tyus Battle, Guard for the BC Enisey
 Marek Dolezaj, Forward for BC Ternopil

See also 
 NCAA Division I men's basketball tournament records
 List of teams with the highest winning percentage in NCAA Division I men's college basketball 
 List of teams with the most victories in NCAA Division I men's college basketball
 NCAA Men's Division I Final Four appearances by coaches
 NCAA Men's Division I Final Four appearances by school
 NCAA Division I men's basketball tournament all-time team records

Notes

References

External links 

 

 
Basketball teams established in 1900
1900 establishments in New York (state)